The 12th Tank Division was formed on October 12, 1969, from 12th Independent Tank Regiment, 264th Tank Self-Propelled Artillery Regiment of Academy of Armored Troops and 2nd Tank School Training Regiment. After its formation the division was soon moved to Jiuquan and Jiayuguan City in Gansu province.

As of December 1969, the division was composed of:
45th Tank Regiment (former 12th Independent Tank Regiment);
46th Tank Regiment (former 264th Tank Self-Propelled Artillery Regiment);
47th Tank Regiment (former 2nd Tank School Training Regiment).

In the early 1970s, the division maintained as a reduced tank division, which consisted of 3 under-equipped tank regiments, under the command of the 19th Army Corps.

Since May 1975 the division was put under the direct command of the Lanzhou Military Region.

Since 1978 the division maintained as a tank division, catalogue B. In December, 46th Tank Regiment exchanged its designation and positions with Tank Regiment, 19th Army Corps.

In July 1983 the Artillery Regiment and the Armored Infantry Regiment were activated.

By then the division was composed of:
45th Tank Regiment
46th Tank Regiment
47th Tank Regiment
Armored Infantry Regiment
Artillery Regiment

Since September 1985, the division was attached to the 21st Army. Its Armored Regiment absorbed the 419th Regiment of the 140th Army Division.

In 1998, the division was renamed the 12th Armored Division. Armored Infantry Regiment was disbanded and absorbed into now armored regiments.

By then the division was composed of:
45th Armored Regiment;
46th Armored Regiment;
47th Armored Regiment;
Artillery Regiment.

In late 2011 the division was split into two: the division itself became 12th Armored Brigade, while half of its battalions formed the 62nd Mechanized Infantry Brigade.

In 2017 the brigade was reorganized as the 12th Heavy Combined Arms Brigade.

References
坦克第12师历史，http://blog.sina.com.cn/s/blog_7d428bbe0100uaxr.html

Armoured brigades of the People's Liberation Army
Military units and formations established in 1969